War Trophies Exhibition was an exhibition of trophies taken by the Red Army from Nazi Germany during the Great Patriotic War, which was held in the Gorky Park in Moscow from June 22, 1943 to October 1, 1948. The exhibition was attended by over 7.5 million people.

Creation 
The decision on creation of the exhibition was adopted by State Defense Committee on April 13, 1943. Exhibition opened on June 22, 1943.

Exposition 
The exposition was divided into 6 sections:
 Artillery;
 Aviation;
 Automotive;
 Armored vehicles;
 Engineering and technical;
 Military logistics.

References

Links 
 Железо со всей Европы / М. Коломиец // Оружие. — 2000. — № 4. — С. 34-44.

Military and war museums in Russia